Heritage Trail is a  long multiuse rail trail connecting Dubuque and Dyersville, Iowa.

It is maintained by the Dubuque County Conservation Board, and was converted from a segment of the former Chicago Great Western railroad line between Chicago and Oelwein, Iowa. It is surfaced with compacted, crushed limestone.

See also
List of rail trails
Parks in Dubuque, Iowa

External links
Heritage Trail official website
Iowa Natural Heritage Foundation trail information

Rail trails in Iowa
Protected areas of Dubuque County, Iowa
Parks in Dubuque, Iowa
National Recreation Trails in Iowa
Iowa